Fahad Khalfan Al Bloushi (born 23 March 1992) is a Qatari footballer who is a striker for Al-Ahli. He has also played for the Qatar national team.

Career

Club career
Khalfan played for the youth teams of Al-Rayyan. He achieved recognition by the national team coach, Bruno Metsu, for scoring decisive goals in the Sheikh Jassem Cup in 2010.

Primarily featuring for the team, he scored 11 goals in 18 appearances in 2010–11 season of the reserve league, and 8 goals in 8 appearances in 2011–12. In the 2011–12 season of the Qatar Stars League, he came on as a substitute for Daniel Goumou in the 86th minute and scored a two-minute brace against Qatar SC in stoppage time.

International career
Khalfan received a call-up to the Qatar national team after his outstanding performances for Al-Rayyan in pre-season. Khalfan made his debut for the national team in a friendly game against Bahrain on September 3, 2010 at the age of 18. He was the first ASPIRE graduate to play for the senior football team of Qatar.

He became renowned for one of the greatest blunders in competitive football on November 15, 2010.  In a match against Uzbekistan in the 2010 Asian Games, with the game tied 0-0, Khalfan intercepted a pass to the opposing goalkeeper in the first minute of extra time and then dribbled to a position where he was a yard from the open goal. Instead of tapping the ball into the empty net with his right foot, he tried to shoot powerfully with the outside of his left foot. This caused the ball to collide with the post and miss. Qatar subsequently lost the match in extra time, 0–1, and was eliminated in the quarter-final stage of the 2010 Asian Games.

References

External links
QSL.com.qa profile

1992 births
Living people
Qatari footballers
Qatar international footballers
Al-Rayyan SC players
Al-Sailiya SC players
Al-Shahania SC players
Qatar SC players
Al-Arabi SC (Qatar) players
Umm Salal SC players
Al Ahli SC (Doha) players
Association football forwards
Qatari people of Baloch descent
Qatar Stars League players
Qatari Second Division players
Footballers at the 2010 Asian Games
Asian Games competitors for Qatar